Anthochitina is an extinct genus of chitinozoans. It was described by Nestor in 1994. It contains a single species, Anthochitina primula.

References

Prehistoric marine animals
Fossil taxa described in 1994